Curling Canada (formerly the Canadian Curling Association (CCA)) is a sanctioning body for the sport of Curling in Canada. It is associated with more than a dozen provincial and territorial curling associations across the country, and organizes Canada's national championships in the sport. It was formed in 1990 by the merger of the two previous sanctioning bodies, Curl Canada (men's) and the Canadian Ladies' Curling Association (women's).

History
The CCA was created in 1990 when Curl Canada and the Canadian Ladies' Curling Association amalgamated. From its creation until 2007, Dave Parkes was the general manager and then chief executive officer (CEO).

Greg Stremlaw was the CEO until 2015 when he took over as head of sports at CBC Sports Katherine Henderson became CEO in 2016 and continues in the position at present.

On February 27, 2015, the organization rebranded as Curling Canada.

Presidents (Chairs of the Board 2008–present)

1935–38: John T. Haig 
1938–39: Elbridge MacKay
1939–40: Ross Harstone
1940–41: Dr. A. F. Anderson
1941–42: Hon. Thane Campbell
1942–46: George Norgan
1946–47: James E. Armstrong
1947–48: Hon. Brig. Colin A. Campbell
1948–49: Murray Macneill
1949–50: Gordon Hudson
1950–51: Fred Lucas
1951–52: Niven Jackson
1952–53: Fielding Rankine
1953–54: Emmett Smith
1954–55: Cyril Boyd
1955–56: Hon. Sen. Richard Donahoe
1956–57: John Dutton
1957–58: Samuel Rothschild
1958–59: Archibald Wilson
1959–60: Walter B. Cowan
1960–61: Alan MacGowan
1961–62: Earl Bourne
1962–63: Ted Pattee
1963–64: Richard T. Topping
1964–65: Arthur Skinner
1965–66: Frank Sargent
1966–67: Hon. Gordon Lockhart Bennett
1967–68: William Lumsden
1968–69: Harry P. Carter
1969: Alf Parkhill
1969–70: H. P. Webb
1970–71: Dr. Maurice Campbell
1971–72: T. Gordon Thompson
1972–73: Irl England
1973–74: D. William Currie
1974–75: L. E. Olson
1975–76: William Leaman
1976–77: David C. Smith
1977–78: Herbert Millham
1978–79: G. Clifton Thompson
1979–80: Frank Stent
1980–81: Cecil Watt
1981–82: Thomas Fisher
1982–83: Cyril S. Walters
1983–84: Ray Kingsmith
1984–85: Dr. Clyde Opaleychuk
1985–86: Ralph Boyd
1986–87: Jerry Muzika
1987–88: Harvey Mazinke
1988–89: Joseph Gurowka
1989–90: Dr. Edward Steeves
1990: Donald R. MacLeod
1990–91: Dr. Edward Steeves
1991–92: Mary-Anne Nicholson
1992–93: Stanley Oleson
1993–94: Evelyn Krahn
1994–95: Lorne Mitton
1995–96: Shirley Morash
1996–97: Pat Reid
1997–98: Harvey Malo
1998–99: Judy Veinot
1999-00: Jack Boutilier
2000–01: Zivan Saper
2001–02: Don Lewis
2002–03: Maureen Miller
2003–04: Don Petlak
2004–05: Barry Greenberg
2005–06: Jerry Shoemaker
2006–07: Donna Duffett
2007–08: Al Forsythe
2008–09: Fran Todd
2009–10: Graham Prouse
2010–11: Jack Bowman
2011–12: Laura Lochanski
2012–13: Ron Hutton
2013–14: Hugh Avery
2014–15: Marilyn Neily
2015–16: Hugh Avery
2016–17: Peter Inch
2017–18: Resby Coutts
2018–19: Maureen Miller
2019–20: John Shea
2020–21: Mitch Minken (until June 2021)
2021–22: Amy Nixon (from June 2021)
2022-23: Michael Szajewski

Championship events
Canadian Mixed Curling Championship
Canadian Mixed Doubles Curling Championship
Canadian Junior Curling Championships
Canadian Visually Impaired Curling Championship
Scotties Tournament of Hearts (women's nationals)
Tim Hortons Brier (men's nationals)
Canada Cup of Curling
Canadian Wheelchair Curling Championship
Canadian Senior Curling Championships
Canadian Masters Curling Championships

Member Associations
Curling Alberta
Curl BC
Curling Québec
Curl Manitoba
New Brunswick Curling Association
Newfoundland and Labrador Curling Association
Northern Ontario Curling Association
Northwest Territories Curling Association
Nova Scotia Curling Association
Nunavut Curling Association
CurlON (Southern Ontario)
Curl PEI
CURLSASK
Yukon Curling Association

See also
 Canadian Team Ranking System (CTRS) standings
 Canadian Curling Hall of Fame

References

Further reading
Bonspiel! The History of Curling in Canada at Library and Archives Canada

External links 
 Official website

 
Curling